South Station (also signed as South Station Under) is a transfer station on the MBTA rapid transit Red Line and bus rapid transit Silver Line, located at Summer Street and Atlantic Avenue in downtown Boston, Massachusetts. It is a part of the South Station complex, the second busiest transportation center in New England. Eight MBTA Commuter Rail and three Amtrak intercity rail services terminate at South Station; many of those passengers then transfer to the rapid transit lines to reach other destinations in the city. With 24,639 daily boardings in 2019, South Station is the busiest station on the MBTA rapid transit system.

History

A station serving South Station was located on the Atlantic Avenue Elevated. Service on the Atlantic Avenue "El" was discontinued on September 20, 1938. The structure itself was torn down in the spring of 1942. Before stairs were added, passengers wishing to change lines from the underground station—itself opened on December 3, 1916—had to use a paper transfer and go outside to change trains. The underground station had four staircases and one escalator leading from the surface to the mezzanine, and two exit escalators.

In 1957, the original fare lobby and the rounded top of the tunnel to the west were removed during construction of the Dewey Square Tunnel. The tunnel was rebuilt with a flat ceiling, while the fare lobby was moved to the east closer to the South Station headhouse. In the 1970s, an artwork by Sylvana Cenci entitled Wheels in Motion was placed in the station. Cenci created the artwork by using explosives to warp a steel plate. She had previously been runner-up in a 1971 competition for public art at State station.

A second renovation began around 1980. An entrance was also added to the Federal Reserve Bank Building as well as a passageway under Summer Street connecting the other street entrances. In 1985, the Red Line platforms were extended 60 feet on either end to allow 6-car trains. A passageway between the Red Line lobby and the interior of South Station opened in June 1990.

The final renovation was triggered by the Big Dig highway project. Since the Red Line tunnel beneath Summer Street is perpendicular to Atlantic Avenue, where the new I-93 northbound tunnel was to be built, builders had to tunnel under the tracks. After the first tunnel was complete, another tunnel was added along with a station for the Silver Line. Since the new tunnel was built at the former fare level, another fare level was constructed a level above. This allowed combined access for the Silver and Red lines. The original lobby that was destroyed was replaced by stairways. This project was completed at a cost of $35 million. An additional $13 million renovation of the Red Line level was undertaken.

After the first sections of the Silver Line opened in 2002 and 2004, a Phase III was proposed which would build a tunnel connecting South Station and the South Boston Waterfront section with the Washington Street section of the line. In 2010, the project was placed on indefinite hold. However, route , operating to a surface stop on Essex Street at Atlantic Avenue, began service on October 13, 2009.

In early 2005, a blue and white tile mosaic reading 'South Station Under' was discovered during renovations to the Red Line platform. The MBTA had the mosaic restored to its original condition during the project. Network, a  glass mosaic map by Ellen Harvey, was built on the interior walls of the northeast headhouse in 2019.

Plans for wayfinding signage, lighting, and other station improvements were completed by May 2021.

Station layout
South Station has entrances at street level on all four corners of the intersection of Summer Street and Atlantic Avenue. The Red Line has two tracks and two side platforms on the lower level. Silver Line SL1, SL2, and SL3 service is provided in a tunnel above the Red Line platforms, Silver Line SL4 service can be accessed at a surface bus top one block south of the station entrances at Atlantic Avenue and Essex Street.

Bus connections
Aside from the Silver Line, three MBTA bus routes stop on Summer Street east of the station entrances:
: –Tide Street
: –Otis Street & Summer Street
: City Point–Bedford Street & Chauncy Street
The station is also located about a block away from the South Station Bus Terminal, main gateway for long-distance buses in Boston.

References

External links

MBTA – South Station
Atlantic Avenue entrance from Google Maps Street View

1916 establishments in Massachusetts
Financial District, Boston
Railway stations located underground in Boston
Railway stations in the United States opened in 1916
Red Line (MBTA) stations
Silver Line (MBTA) stations